Dujiangyan is an ancient irrigation system in China.

Dujiangyan may also refer to:

Dujiangyan City, Sichuan, China, named after the irrigation system
Dujiangyan (film), 1995 Chinese documentary film about the irrigation system